Vaskovo is a rural locality (a village) in Sizemskoye Rural Settlement, Sheksninsky District, Vologda Oblast, Russia. The population was 19 as of 2002.

Geography 
Vaskovo is located 60 km north of Sheksna (the district's administrative centre) by road. Ivashyovo is the nearest rural locality.

References 

Rural localities in Sheksninsky District